Little Chicago is an unincorporated residential and agricultural community on Marathon County Highway A in located along the border of the towns of Hamburg and Berlin, in Marathon County, Wisconsin, United States.

History
The community was originally named Ziegler.  In 1898, Ziegler had 60 people, a planing mill and a saw mill, one cheese factory; one hardware and one shoe store, and a Lutheran church.  The United States Post Office delivered mail three times a week.  In 1909, Ziegler had a post office.

The community reportedly got the name Little Chicago during the Prohibition era in the early 20th century, when a local tavern was dispensing illegal alcoholic beverages.

Notable people
Robert Plisch, Wisconsin state legislator and farmer, lived in Ziegler.

Media
Little Chicago was the setting of Adam Rapp's novel Little Chicago.

References

External links

Unincorporated communities in Marathon County, Wisconsin
Unincorporated communities in Wisconsin